The Diocese of Ghent (Latin: Dioecesis Gandavensis) is a Latin Church ecclesiastical territory or diocese of the Catholic Church in Belgium. It is a suffragan in the ecclesiastical province of the metropolitan Archdiocese of Mechelen-Brussels. The patron of the diocese is Saint Bavo of Ghent.

History 
The diocese was erected in 1559 by papal bull Super universas to become independent of the Diocese of Tournai. Ghent had an important local administration and was the location of the Abbey of Saint Bavo, founded by Saint Amandus. However, this abbey was suppressed and the canons were removed, moving to the collegiate church of Saint John, and it changed its name to Saint Bavo. This collegiate church became the see of the current diocese. The diocese was created from the surrounding dioceses in Belgium.

Territorial structure 
Originally, the diocese was much larger and contained the city of Hulst. Currently, the diocese is coextensive with the Belgian province of East Flanders, in addition to the municipality of Zwijndrecht, which is in the secular Province of Antwerp.

Administration 
The diocese produced some important priests and clergy like Edward Poppe. The current bishop is Abbot Lode Van Hecke who was appointed by pope Francis in 2019. The diocese is a suffragan of the Archdiocese of Mechelen-Brussels.

Saints 
 Pharaildis
 Bavo of Ghent
 Livinus

Ordinaries

The Bishop of Ghent is the ordinary of the Diocese of Ghent.

List of the bishops of the Diocese of Ghent, Belgium

Other affiliated bishops

Coadjutor Bishops
Gustavo Leonardo de Battice (1877-1885), did not succeed to see
Franciscus Renatus Boussen (1832-1834), did not succeed to see; appointed Bishop of Brugge {Bruges}
Honoré-Joseph Coppieters (1927)
Henri-Charles-Camille Lambrecht (1886-1888)
Arthur Luysterman (1990-1991)

Auxiliary Bishops
Leo-Karel Jozef De Kesel (1960-1990)
Nicolas French (1668-1678)
Oscar Jozef Joliet (1948-1969)
Eugène Victor Marie van Rechem (1914-1943)

Other priests of this diocese who became bishops
Lodewijk Aerts, appointed Bishop of Brugge {Bruges} in 2016
Josef De Kesel, appointed auxiliary bishop of Mechelen-Brussel {Malines-Brussels} in 2002; future Cardinal
Gustaaf Joos, appointed titular archbishop and then Cardinal in 2003
Paul Van den Berghe, appointed Bishop of Antwerp in 1980
François Camille Van Ronslé (priest here 1886-1889), appointed Vicar Apostolic of Belgian Congo {Congo Belga} [o Indipendente, Congo (Dem. Rep.)] in 1896

See also
 Major Seminary of Ghent
 St. Joseph Minor Seminary: former Seminary of the diocese.
 Paul van Imschoot
 List of Catholic churches in Belgium

References

External links

Diocese of Ghent on Gcatholic.com 

Ghent
 
1559 establishments in the Holy Roman Empire